William Croad Lovering (February 25, 1835 – February 4, 1910) was a U.S. Representative from Massachusetts.

Biography
Born in Woonsocket, Rhode Island, Lovering moved with his parents to Taunton, Massachusetts, in 1837.
He attended the Cambridge High School and the Hopkins Classical School, Cambridge, Massachusetts.
He left school in 1859 for employment in his father's mill.
During the Civil War served as quartermaster of Engineers in the Second Massachusetts Brigade, consisting of the Second and Third Regiments.
He engaged in cotton manufacturing in Taunton at the Whittenton Mills.
First president of the Taunton Street Railway.
He served as president of the American Liability Insurance Co.
He was interested in several other business enterprises.
He served as president of the New England Cotton Manufacturers' Association (now the National Textile Association) for two years.
He served as member of the Massachusetts Senate in 1874 and 1875.
He served as delegate to the Republican National Convention in 1880.
Presided at the Republican State convention in 1892.

Lovering was elected as a Republican to the Fifty-fifth and to the six succeeding Congresses and served from March 4, 1897, until his death in Atlanta, Georgia, February 4, 1910 of pneumonia. He was interred in Mount Pleasant Cemetery, Taunton, Massachusetts.

His daughter, Frances, married Charles Francis Adams III, United States Secretary of the Navy under Herbert Hoover and a member of the Adams political family.

See also

 1874 Massachusetts legislature
 1875 Massachusetts legislature
List of United States Congress members who died in office (1900–49)

References

Bibliography
Who's Who in State Politics, 1908 Practical Politics  (1908) p. 16. 
 Retrieved on 2008-02-14

William C. Lovering, late a representative from Massachusetts, Memorial addresses delivered in the House of Representatives and Senate frontispiece 1911

1835 births
1910 deaths
Republican Party Massachusetts state senators
Union Army officers
People from Woonsocket, Rhode Island
Politicians from Taunton, Massachusetts
People of Massachusetts in the American Civil War
Deaths from pneumonia in Washington, D.C.
Republican Party members of the United States House of Representatives from Massachusetts
19th-century American politicians
Burials at Mount Pleasant Cemetery (Taunton, Massachusetts)